Viliahazo  is a rural municipality in Analamanga Region, in the  Central Highlands of Madagascar. It belongs to the district of Antananarivo Avaradrano, 20 km north of the capital Antananarivo and its population numbers to 2,513 in 2019.

Economy
The economy is based on substantial agriculture.  Rice, corn, peanuts, beans, manioc are the main crops.

References

Monographie de la Commune

External links

Populated places in Analamanga